The 2017 TCR Trophy Europe was the second holding of the TCR Trophy Europe, and the only one held as one-off event on 28–29 October in Adria International Raceway in Italy for drivers from the national and regional European TCR series.

Teams and drivers

Final standings

Notes 
 14 drivers (Aurélien Comte, Giacomo Altoé, Josh Files, Maxime Potty, Florian Thoma, Antti Buri, Luca Engstler, Francisco Abreu, Plamen Kralev, Lev Tolkachev, Oli Kangas, Denis Grigoriev, Danielle Cappellari and Kevin Giacon) received 5 pre-qualifying points for competing in at least 5 rounds in either their national championships or in the European TCR International Series rounds. Luigi Ferrara was awarded 4 points.
 As the Hyundai i30 N TCR was with temporary homologation, Gabriele Tarquini was ineligible to score points and was considered transparent in the final standings

Teams' Trophy

References

External links

2017 in Italian motorsport
Europe Trophy
October 2017 sports events in Europe